Right-wing politics describes the range of political ideologies that view certain social orders and hierarchies as inevitable, natural, normal, or desirable, typically supporting this position based on natural law, economics, authority, property or tradition. Hierarchy and inequality may be seen as natural results of traditional social differences or competition in market economies.

Right-wing politics are considered the counterpart to left-wing politics, and the left–right political spectrum is one of the most widely accepted political spectrums. The term right-wing can generally refer to the section of a political party or system that advocates free enterprise and private ownership, and typically favours socially traditional ideas.

The right includes social conservatives and fiscal conservatives as well as social liberals and right-wing libertarians (fiscally laissez-faire).

Positions 
The following positions are typically associated with right-wing politics.

Anti-communism 

The original use of the term "right-wing", relative to communism, placed the conservatives on the right, the liberals in the centre and the communists on the left. Both the conservatives and the liberals were strongly anti-communist. The history of the use of the term right-wing about anti-communism is a complicated one.

Early Marxist movements were at odds with the traditional monarchies that ruled over much of the European continent at the time. Many European monarchies outlawed the public expression of communist views and the Communist Manifesto, which began "[a] spectre [that] is haunting Europe", and stated that monarchs feared for their thrones. Advocacy of communism was illegal in the Russian Empire, the German Empire, and Austria-Hungary, the three most powerful monarchies in continental Europe before World War I. Many monarchists (except constitutional monarchists) viewed inequality in wealth and political power as resulting from a divine natural order. The struggle between monarchists and communists was often described as a struggle between the Right and the Left.

By World War I, in most European monarchies the divine right of kings had become discredited and was replaced by liberal and nationalist movements. Most European monarchs became figureheads, or they yielded some power to elected governments. The most conservative European monarchy, the Russian Empire, was replaced by the communist Soviet Union. The Russian Revolution inspired a series of other communist revolutions across Europe in the years 1917–1923. Many of these, such as the German Revolution, were defeated by nationalist and monarchist military units. During this period, nationalism began to be considered right-wing, especially when it opposed the internationalism of the communists.
The 1920s and 1930s saw the decline of traditional right-wing politics. The mantle of conservative anti-communism was taken up by the rising fascist movements on the one hand and by American-inspired liberal conservatives on the other. When communist groups and political parties began appearing around the world, their opponents were usually colonial authorities and the term right-wing came to be applied to colonialism.

After World War II, communism became a global phenomenon and anti-communism became an integral part of the domestic and foreign policies of the United States and its NATO allies. Conservatism in the post-war era abandoned its monarchist and aristocratic roots, focusing instead on patriotism, religious values, and nationalism. Throughout the Cold War, colonial governments in Asia, Africa, and Latin America turned to the United States for political and economic support. Communists were also enemies of capitalism, portraying Wall Street as the oppressor of the masses. The United States made anti-communism the top priority of its foreign policy, and many American conservatives sought to combat what they saw as communist influence at home. This led to the adoption of several domestic policies that are collectively known under the term McCarthyism. While both liberals and conservatives were anti-communist, the followers of Senator McCarthy were called right-wing and those on the right called liberals who favored free speech, even for communists, leftist.

Economics 
In post-revolutionary France, the Right fought against the rising power of those who had grown rich through commerce, and sought to preserve the rights of the hereditary nobility. They were uncomfortable with capitalism, the Enlightenment, individualism, and industrialism, and fought to retain traditional social hierarchies and institutions. In Europe's history, there have been strong collectivist right-wing movements, such as in the social Catholic right, that have exhibited hostility to all forms of liberalism (including economic liberalism) and have historically advocated for paternalist class harmony involving an organic-hierarchical society where workers are protected while class hierarchy remains.

In the nineteenth century, the Right had shifted to support the newly rich in some European countries (particularly England) and instead of favouring the nobility over industrialists, favoured capitalists over the working class. Other right-wing movements—such as Carlism in Spain and nationalist movements in France, Germany, and Russia—remained hostile to capitalism and industrialism. Nevertheless, a few right-wing movements—notably the French Nouvelle Droite, CasaPound, and American paleoconservatism—are often in opposition to capitalist ethics and the effects they have on society. These forces see capitalism and industrialism as infringing upon or causing the decay of social traditions or hierarchies that are essential for social order.

In modern times, "right-wing" is sometimes used to describe laissez-faire capitalism. In Europe, capitalists formed alliances with the Right during their conflicts with workers after 1848. In France, the Right's support of capitalism can be traced to the late nineteenth century. The so-called neoliberal Right, popularised by US President Ronald Reagan and UK Prime Minister Margaret Thatcher, combines support for free markets, privatisation, and deregulation with traditional right-wing support for social conformity. Right-wing libertarianism (sometimes known as libertarian conservatism or conservative libertarianism) supports a decentralised economy based on economic freedom and holds property rights, free markets, and free trade to be the most important kinds of freedom. Political theorist Russell Kirk believed that freedom and property rights were interlinked.

Those on the economic left, as well as some conservative authoritarians, have supported fascism and corporatism, a political ideology which advocates the organization of society by corporate groups—such as agricultural, labour, military, scientific, or guild associations—based on their common interests.

Nationalism 

In France, nationalism was originally a left-wing and republican ideology. After the period of boulangisme and the Dreyfus Affair, nationalism became a trait of the right-wing. Right-wing nationalists sought to define and defend a "true" national identity from elements which they believed were corrupting that identity. Some were supremacists, who in accordance with scientific racism and social Darwinism applied the concept of "survival of the fittest" to nations and races. Right-wing nationalism was influenced by Romantic nationalism, in which the state derives its political legitimacy from the organic unity of those who it governs. This generally includes the language, race, culture, religion, and customs of the nation, all of which were "born" within its culture. Linked with right-wing nationalism is cultural conservatism, which supports the preservation of the heritage of a nation or culture and often sees deviations from cultural norms as an existential threat.

Natural law and traditionalism 

Right-wing politics typically justifies a hierarchical society based on natural law or tradition.

Traditionalism was advocated by a group of United States university professors (labelled the "New Conservatives" by the popular press) who rejected the concepts of individualism, liberalism, modernity, and social progress, seeking instead to promote what they identified as cultural and educational renewal and a revived interest in concepts perceived by traditionalists as truths that endure from age to age alongside basic institutions of western society such as the church, the family, the state, and business.

Populism 

Right-wing populism is a combination of civic-nationalism, cultural-nationalism and sometimes ethno-nationalism, localism, along with anti-elitism, using populist rhetoric to provide a critique of existing political institutions. According to Margaret Canovan, a right-wing populist is "a charismatic leader, using the tactics of politicians' populism to go past the politicians and intellectual elite and appeal to the reactionary sentiments of the populace, often buttressing his claim to speak for the people by the use of referendums".

In Europe, right-wing populism often takes the form of distrust of the European Union, and of politicians in general, combined with anti-immigrant rhetoric and a call for a return to traditional, national values. Daniel Stockemer states, the radical right is, "Targeting immigrants as a threat to employment, security and cultural cohesion."

In the United States, the Tea Party movement stated that the core beliefs for membership were the primacy of individual liberties as defined by the Constitution of the United States, preference for a small federal government, and respect for the rule of law. Some policy positions included opposition to illegal immigration and support for a strong national military force, the right to individual gun ownership, cutting taxes, reducing government spending, and balancing the budget.

Religion 

Philosopher and diplomat Joseph de Maistre argued for the indirect authority of the Pope over temporal matters. According to Maistre, only governments which were founded upon Christian constitutions—which were implicit in the customs and institutions of all European societies, especially the Catholic European monarchies—could avoid the disorder and bloodshed that followed the implementation of rationalist political programs, such as the chaos which occurred during the French Revolution. Some prelates of the Church of England–established by Henry VIII and headed by the current sovereign—are given seats in the House of Lords (as Lords Spiritual), but they are considered politically neutral rather than specifically right- or left-wing.

American right-wing media outlets oppose sex outside marriage and same-sex marriage, and they sometimes reject scientific positions on evolution and other matters where science tends to disagree with the Bible.

The term family values has been used by right-wing parties—such as the Republican Party in the United States, the Family First Party in Australia, the Conservative Party in the United Kingdom, and the Bharatiya Janata Party in India—to signify support for traditional families and opposition to the changes the modern world has made in how families live. Supporters of "family values" may oppose abortion, euthanasia, and birth control.

Outside the West, the Hindu nationalist movement has attracted privileged groups which fear encroachment on their dominant positions, as well as "plebeian" and impoverished groups which seek recognition around a majoritarian rhetoric of cultural pride, order, and national strength.

In Israel, Meir Kahane advocated that Israel should be a theocratic state, where non-Jews have no voting rights, and the far-right Lehava strictly opposes Jewish assimilation and the Christian presence in Israel. The Jewish Defence League (JDL) in the United States was classified as "a right wing terrorist group" by the FBI in 2001.

Many Islamist groups have been called right-wing, including the Great Union Party, the Combatant Clergy Association/Association of Militant Clergy, and the Islamic Society of Engineers of Iran.

Social stratification 

Right-wing politics involves, in varying degrees, the rejection of some egalitarian objectives of left-wing politics, claiming either that social or economic inequality is natural and inevitable or that it is beneficial to society. Right-wing ideologies and movements support social order. The original French right-wing was called "the party of order" and held that France needed a strong political leader to keep order.

Conservative British scholar R. J. White, who rejects egalitarianism, wrote: "Men are equal before God and the laws, but unequal in all else; hierarchy is the order of nature, and privilege is the reward of honourable service". American conservative Russell Kirk also rejected egalitarianism as imposing sameness, stating: "Men are created different; and a government that ignores this law becomes an unjust government for it sacrifices nobility to mediocrity". Kirk took as one of the "canons" of conservatism the principle that "civilized society requires orders and classes". Italian scholar Norberto Bobbio argued that the right-wing is inegalitarian compared to the left-wing, as he argued that equality is a relative, not absolute, concept.

Right libertarians reject collective or state-imposed equality as undermining reward for personal merit, initiative, and enterprise. In their view, such imposed equality is unjust, limits personal freedom, and leads to social uniformity and mediocrity.

In the view of philosopher Jason Stanley in How Fascism Works, the "politics of hierarchy" is one of the hallmarks of fascism, which refers to a "glorious past" in which members of the rightfully dominant group sat atop the hierarchy, and attempt to recreate this state of being.

History 
According to The Cambridge History of Twentieth-Century Political Thought, the Right has gone through five distinct historical stages:
 The reactionary right sought a return to aristocracy and established religion.
 The moderate right distrusted intellectuals and sought limited government.
 The radical right favored a romantic and aggressive form of nationalism.
 The extreme right proposed anti-immigration policies and implicit racism.
 The neo-liberal right sought to combine a market economy and economic deregulation with the traditional right-wing beliefs in patriotism, elitism and law and order.

The political terms Left and Right were first used in the 18th century, during the French Revolution, referencing the seating arrangement of the French parliament. Those who sat to the right of the chair of the presiding officer (le président) were generally supportive of the institutions of the monarchist Old Regime. The original "Right" in France was formed in reaction to the "Left" and comprised those supporting hierarchy, tradition, and clericalism. The expression  ("the right") increased in use after the restoration of the monarchy in 1815, when it was applied to the ultra-royalists.

From the 1830s to the 1880s, the Western world's social class structure and economy shifted from nobility and aristocracy towards capitalism. This shift affected centre-right movements such as the British Conservative Party, which responded supporting capitalism.

The people of English-speaking countries did not apply the terms right and left to their politics until the 20th century. The term right-wing was originally applied to traditional conservatives, monarchists, and reactionaries; a revision of this which occurred sometime between the 1920s and 1950s considers the far-right to denote fascism, Nazism, and racial supremacy.

Rightist regimes were common in Europe in the Interwar period, 1919–1938.

France

The political term right-wing was first used during the French Revolution, when liberal deputies of the Third Estate generally sat to the left of the presiding officer's chair, a custom that began in the Estates General of 1789. The nobility, members of the Second Estate, generally sat to the right. In the successive legislative assemblies, monarchists who supported the Old Regime were commonly referred to as rightists because they sat on the right side. A major figure on the right was Joseph de Maistre, who argued for an authoritarian form of conservatism.

Throughout the 19th century, the main line dividing Left and Right in France was between supporters of the republic (often secularists) and supporters of the monarchy (often Catholics). On the right, the Legitimists and Ultra-royalists held counter-revolutionary views, while the Orléanists hoped to create a constitutional monarchy under their preferred branch of the royal family, which briefly became a reality after the 1830 July Revolution.

The centre-right Gaullists in post-World War II France advocated considerable social spending on education and infrastructure development as well as extensive economic regulation, but limited the wealth redistribution measures characteristic of social democracy.

Hungary
The dominance of the political right of inter-war Hungary, after the collapse of a short-lived Communist regime, was described by historian István Deák:
Between 1919 and 1944 Hungary was a rightist country. Forged out of a counter-revolutionary heritage, its governments advocated a "nationalist Christian" policy; they extolled heroism, faith, and unity; they despised the French Revolution, and they spurned the liberal and socialist ideologies of the 19th century. The governments saw Hungary as a bulwark against bolshevism and bolshevism’s instruments: socialism, cosmopolitanism, and Freemasonry. They perpetrated the rule of a small clique of aristocrats, civil servants, and army officers, and surrounded with adulation the head of the state, the counterrevolutionary Admiral Horthy.

India
Although freedom fighters are favoured, the right-wing tendency to elect or appoint politicians and government officials based on aristocratic and religious ties is common to almost all the states of India. Multiple political parties however identify with terms and beliefs which are, by political consensus, right or left wing. Certain political parties such as the Bharatiya Janata Party, identify with conservative and nationalist elements. Some, such as the Indian National Congress, take a liberal stance. The Communist Party of India, Communist Party of India (Marxist), and others, identify with left-wing socialist and communist concepts. Other political parties take differing stands, and hence cannot be clearly grouped as the left- and the right-wing.

United Kingdom

In British politics, the terms right and left came into common use for the first time in the late 1930s during debates over the Spanish Civil War.

United States

In the United States, following the Second World War, social conservatives joined with right-wing elements of the Republican Party to gain support in traditionally Democratic voting populations like white southerners and Catholics. Ronald Reagan's election to the presidency in 1980 cemented the alliance between the religious right in the United States and social conservatives.

In 2019, the United States populace leaned center-right, with 37% of Americans self-identifying as conservative, compared to 35% moderate and 24% liberal. This was continuing a decades long trend of the country leaning center-right.

The United States Department of Homeland Security defines right-wing extremism in the United States as "broadly divided into those groups, movements, and adherents that are primarily hate-oriented (based on hatred of particular religious, racial or ethnic groups), and those that are mainly anti-government, rejecting federal authority in favor of state or local authority, or rejecting government authority entirely. It may include groups and individuals that are dedicated to a single issue, such as opposition to abortion or immigration."

Types 
The meaning of right-wing "varies across societies, historical epochs, and political systems and ideologies." According to The Concise Oxford Dictionary of Politics, in liberal democracies, the political right opposes socialism and social democracy. Right-wing parties include conservatives, Christian democrats, classical liberals, and nationalists, as well as fascists on the far-right.

British academics Noël O'Sullivan and Roger Eatwell divide the right into five types: reactionary, moderate, radical, extreme, and new. Chip Berlet wrote that each of these "styles of thought" are "responses to the left", including liberalism and socialism, which have arisen since the 1789 French Revolution.

 The reactionary right looks toward the past and is "aristocratic, religious and authoritarian".
 The moderate right, typified by the writings of Edmund Burke, is tolerant of change, provided it is gradual and accepts some aspects of liberalism, including the rule of law and capitalism, although it sees radical laissez-faire and individualism as harmful to society. The moderate right often promotes nationalism and social welfare policies.
 Radical right is a descriptive term which was developed after World War II and it was applied to groups and ideologies such as McCarthyism, the John Birch Society, Thatcherism, and the Republikaner Party. Eatwell stresses that this usage of the term has "major typological problems" because it "has also been applied to clearly democratic developments." The radical right includes right-wing populism and various other subtypes.
 The extreme right has four traits: "1) anti-democracy, 2) ultranationalism, 3) racism, and 4) the strong state."
 The New Right consists of the liberal conservatives, who stress small government, free markets, and individual initiative.

Other authors make a distinction between the centre-right and the far-right.
 Parties of the centre-right generally support liberal democracy, capitalism, the market economy (though they may accept government regulation to control monopolies), private property rights, and a limited welfare state (for example, government provision of education and medical care). They support conservatism and economic liberalism and oppose socialism and communism.
 By contrast, the phrase "far-right" is used to describe those who favor an absolutist government, which uses the power of the state to support the dominant ethnic group or religion and criminalize other ethnic groups or religions. Typical examples of leaders to whom the far-right label is often applied are: Francisco Franco in Spain, Benito Mussolini in Italy, Adolf Hitler in Nazi Germany, and Augusto Pinochet in Chile.

See also 

 1955 System
 Alt-right
 Christian right
 Conservative revolutionary movement
 Dark Enlightenment
 List of right-wing political parties
 New Right
 Old Right
 Organicism
 Paleoconservatism
 Paternalistic conservatism
 Radical right (Europe)
 Radical right (United States)
 Right-wing authoritarianism
 Right-wing terrorism 
 Structural functionalism
 Trumpism

References

Further reading 
 
 Bacchetta, Paola, and Margaret Power, eds. 2002. Right-Wing Women: From Conservatives to Extremists around the World. New York: Routledge.
 Berlet, Chip. 2006. "When Alienation turns Right." In The Evolution of Alienation: Trauma, Promise, and the Millennium, edited by Langman, Lauren, and Kalekin-Fishman.  Lanham, MD: Rowman & Littlefield. , 
 Davies, Peter. 2002. The Extreme Right in France, 1789 to the Present: From De Maistre to Le Pen. New York, NY: Routledge. , .
 Eatwell, Roger. 1999. "Conclusion: The 'End of Ideology'." In Contemporary Political Ideologies, edited by R. Eatwell and A. Wright. Continuum International Publishing Group. , .
 —— 2004. "Introduction: the new extreme right challenge." In Western Democracies and the new Extreme Right Challenge, edited by R. Eatwell and C. Muddle. London: Routledge. , 
 Fielitz, Maik, and Laura Lotte Laloire, eds. 2016. Trouble on the Far Right. Contemporary Right-Wing Strategies and Practices in Europe. Bielefeld: transcript. 
 Gottlieb, Julie, and Clarisse Berethezéne, eds. 2017. Rethinking right-wing women: Gender and the Conservative Party, 1880s to the present.

External links 
 
 

 
Political spectrum
Political terminology